Yuliya Siparenko (born 22 April 1980) is a Ukrainian alpine skier. She competed at the 2002 Winter Olympics and the 2006 Winter Olympics.

References

1980 births
Living people
Ukrainian female alpine skiers
Olympic alpine skiers of Ukraine
Alpine skiers at the 2002 Winter Olympics
Alpine skiers at the 2006 Winter Olympics
Sportspeople from Kyiv
21st-century Ukrainian women